Catenospegazzinia is a genus of sac fungi.

References

External links 

 Catenospegazzinia at global names

Ascomycota genera
Ascomycota enigmatic taxa
Taxa described in 1991